Indiana's 8th congressional district is a congressional district in the U.S. state of Indiana. Based in southwest and west central Indiana, the district is anchored in Evansville and also includes Jasper, Princeton, Terre Haute, Vincennes and Washington.

Previously referred to as "The Bloody Eighth" at the local (and sometimes national) levels (see below for explanation), it was formerly a notorious swing district. However, due to a political realignment, it has in recent elections become a safe Republican district. With a Cook Partisan Voting Index rating of R+19, it is tied for the most Republican district in Indiana.

Election results from presidential races

Counties located within the district 

As of 2023, Indiana’s 8th congressional district is located in southwest and west central Indiana. It includes Clay, Crawford, Daviess, Dubois, Gibson, Greene, Knox, Martin, Owen, Parke, Perry, Pike, Posey, Spencer, Sullivan, Vanderburgh, Vermillion, Vigo, and Warrick Counties, and half of Fountain.

Fountain County is split between this district and the 4th district. They are partitioned on the western border by Indiana State Rt 32, East Prairie Chapel Rd, and South New Liberty Rd, and on the southeastern border by North Sandhill Rd, Indiana West 260N, North Portland Arch Rd, West County Home Rd, and Indiana West 450N. The 8th district takes in the 5 townships of Fulton, Jackson, Millcreek, Van Buren, and Wabash, as well as most of the township of Troy and part of the township of Cain.

Cities of 10,000 or more people
(2010 Census)
 Evansville - 117,429
 Terre Haute - 60,785
 Vincennes - 18,423
 Jasper - 15,038
 Washington - 11,509

2,500 - 10,000 people
(2010 Census)
 Princeton - 8,644
 Brazil - 7,912
 Tell City - 7,272
 Mt. Vernon - 6,687
 Boonville - 6,246
 Linton - 5,413
 Clinton - 4,893
 North Terre Haute - 4,305
 Sullivan - 4,249
 Newburgh - 3,325
 Fort Branch - 2,771
 Bicknell - 2,892

History

Based in Evansville, the 8th Congressional District was widened when Indiana lost a seat after the 2000 U.S. Census to include much of the former 5th and 7th Congressional Districts. At that time, Bloomington (the home of former U.S. Representative Frank McCloskey) was moved into the 9th Congressional District, while the 8th Congressional District was extended northward to include much of the former 7th Congressional District in west-central Indiana, including Terre Haute. As a result of this expansion, the district is the largest in area in Indiana with all or part of 18 counties.

The district has been nicknamed "The Bloody Eighth" because of a series of hard-fought campaigns and political reversals.  Unlike most other districts in the state, which tend to give their representatives long tenures in Washington, the 8th Congressional District has a reputation for frequently ousting incumbents from both parties. Since 1983, no one has held the seat or its predecessors for longer than 12 years. Voters in the district ousted six incumbents from 1966 to 1982. The election in 1984 was so close that the House of Representatives itself determined which of two candidates to seat, accepting the recommendation of the Democratic-controlled House task force sent to Indiana to count the ballots. Democratic incumbent  Frank McCloskey ultimately won by a margin of four votes out of 233,000 cast. After that, McCloskey was reelected four more times before losing to Republican John Hostettler in 1994, amid the Republican Revolution. Hostettler represented the district for six terms before being defeated in a landslide by moderate Democrat Brad Ellsworth in 2006. It was the first district picked up by the Democrats that year, and was one of thirty nationwide that they gained while regaining control of the House. Ellsworth ran unsuccessfully for U.S. Senate in 2010 and was succeeded by Republican Larry Bucshon in the same election cycle. Although Southern Indiana is ancestrally Democratic, the Democrats in this area are nowhere near as liberal as their counterparts in the rest of the state. Historically, it had a character similar to Yellow Dog Democrat districts in neighboring Kentucky. The district also has a strong tint of social conservatism.

In 2000, a New York Times reporter said of the district: "With a populist streak and a conservative bent, this district does not cotton to country club Republicans or to social-engineering liberals," and also said, "More than 95 percent white and about 41 percent rural, the region shares much of the flavor of the Bible Belt."

In 2013, the district shifted and was pushed southward toward Evansville, losing Fountain and Warren Counties, and gaining Dubois, Perry, and Spencer Counties, and a portion of Crawford County, uniting southwestern Indiana under one district.

List of members representing the district

Election results

2002

2004

2006

2008

2010

2012

2014

2016

2018

2020

Historical district boundaries

See also

Indiana's congressional districts
List of United States congressional districts

References

 Congressional Biographical Directory of the United States 1774–present

08
Southwestern Indiana
West Central Indiana
Clay County, Indiana
Daviess County, Indiana
Fountain County, Indiana
Gibson County, Indiana
Greene County, Indiana
Knox County, Indiana
Martin County, Indiana
Owen County, Indiana
Parke County, Indiana
Pike County, Indiana
Posey County, Indiana
Putnam County, Indiana
Sullivan County, Indiana
Vanderburgh County, Indiana
Vermillion County, Indiana
Vigo County, Indiana
Warren County, Indiana
Warrick County, Indiana
Evansville, Indiana
Terre Haute, Indiana
Vincennes, Indiana
1843 establishments in Indiana
Constituencies established in 1843